Fuel temperature coefficient of reactivity is the change in reactivity of the nuclear fuel per degree change in the fuel temperature. The coefficient quantifies the amount of neutrons that the nuclear fuel (such as uranium-238) absorbs from the fission process as the fuel temperature increases. It is a measure of the stability of the reactor operations. This coefficient is also known as the Doppler coefficient due to the contribution of Doppler broadening, which is the dominant effect in thermal systems.

Contributing effects

Doppler broadening 
Increased thermal motion of atoms within the fuel results in a broadening of resonance capture cross-section peaks, resulting in an increased neutron capture rate.

Thermal expansion 
Thermal expansion of the fuel at higher temperatures results in a lower density which reduces the likelihood of a neutron interacting with the fuel.

See also
Nuclear fission
Nuclear reactor physics
Void coefficient

References 

USNRC Glossary

Nuclear technology